Kliche is a German language surname. It stems from the male given name Clemens – and may refer to:
Ulf Kliche (1969), German former professional footballer
Uwe Kliche (1938), German weightlifter

References 

German-language surnames
Surnames from given names